Nadira Banu Begum (14 March 1618 – 6 June 1659) was a Mughal princess and the wife of  the Crown prince, Dara Shikoh, the eldest son and heir-apparent of the Mughal emperor Shah Jahan. After Aurangzeb's rise to power, Dara Shikoh's immediate family and supporters were in grave danger. Nadira died in 1659, a few months before her husband's execution, and was survived by two sons and a daughter.

Family and lineage
Nadira Banu Begum was born a Mughal princess and was the daughter of Sultan Parvez Mirza, the second son of Emperor Jahangir from his wife, Sahib-i-Jamal Begum. Her mother, Jahan Banu Begum, was also a Mughal princess, the daughter of Sultan Murad Mirza, the second son of Emperor Akbar. Nadira was a half-cousin of her future husband, Dara Shikoh, as her father, Sultan Parvez Mirza, was the older half-brother of Dara's father, Shah Jahan.

Marriage

In 1631, arrangements for the planned wedding of Dara Shikoh and Nadira Begum were halted when Dara Shikoh's mother, Empress Mumtaz Mahal, died while giving birth to her fourteenth child, Gauharara Begum. After the Empress' death, the Mughal Empire plunged into mourning. Shah Jahan was consumed by grief, but, after the coaxing of many including his favorite daughter Jahanara Begum, Shah Jahan allowed wedding plans to resume under her oversight.

Nadira and Dara Shikoh married on 11 February 1633 at Agra amidst grand celebrations. The nikah ceremony was performed after midnight. By all accounts, Nadira and Dara were both devoted to each other, and Dara can perhaps be considered more devoted to Nadira than Shah Jahan was to Mumtaz Mahal; unlike his father, Dara never married again, although he had many concubines.

Nadira bore eight children, with two sons, Sulaiman Shikoh (1635) and Sipihr Shikoh (1644), and a daughter, Jahanzeb Banu Begum (born later, though the specific date is unknown), affectionately known as Jani Begum, surviving to play important roles in future events.

Nadira Begum wielded great influence in her husband's harem and was granted the right to issue farmans and nishans. This privilege was allowed only to those who held the highest rank in the imperial harem. The only other woman who had this right apart from Nadira was her cousin and sister-in-law, Jahanara Begum. The two women are believed to have gotten on well, a fact which probably sprung from Jahanara’s involvement in Nadira's wedding and her closeness to her brother. Jahanara had consciously decided to support Dara, the most beloved to her of all of her siblings, over Aurangzeb, and she made outward demonstrations of this decision by decelerating her love for her eldest brother Dara Shikoh. According to legend, when Aurangzeb fell sick sometime during his teen years, he called Jahanara to ask her if she would support him in his bid for the crown. She refused. Despite how unpopular this made her in his sight, she went on to become the head of the harem in Aurangzeb’s court.

Nadira Banu amassed a fine collection of paintings made by her husband; Dara Shikoh, a patron of the arts, was said to be a fine painter. He gifted these to her, calling her his "dearest and intimate friend." The collection was bound in together in what is now known as the "Dara Shikoh Album," currently held in a museum collection.

Death

Nadira Begum died on 6 June 1659 of dysentery while she was accompanying her husband and family in Bolan Pass, Pakistan. She had been described as faithful and devoted to her husband during the hardships in his life. Her death drew Dara into such a frantic state of grief that his own fate appeared as a matter of indifference to him.

Nadira's last wish was to be buried in India, but Dara sent his deceased wife's corpse for burial in Lahore under guard of his soldiers. The princess' tomb was built next to Mian Mir's tomb in Lahore, Pakistan, who had been the spiritual instructor of Dara Shikoh.

Ancestry

In popular culture
Nadira Banu Begum is a principal character in Indu Sundaresan's historical novel Shadow Princess (2010).
Nadira Banu Begum is a character in Ruchir Gupta's historical novel Mistress of the Throne (2014).

References

Mughal princesses
Indian female royalty
1659 deaths
Mughal nobility
Women of the Mughal Empire
Year of birth unknown
17th-century Indian women
17th-century Indian people
1618 births